Kwame Brathwaite (born 1938) is an American photojournalist and activist known for popularizing the phrase "Black is Beautiful" and documenting life and culture in Harlem and Africa.

Life and work 
Kwame Brathwaite is a documentary photojournalist, born and brought up in New York City, to immigrant parents from Barbados, who chronicled the cultural, political, and social developments of Harlem, Africa, and the African diaspora. As a boy in the early 1950s he was enrolled School of Industrial Art (now the High School of Art and Design).

With his older brother Elombe Brath, Brathwaite founded the African Jazz Art Society and Studios in 1956 and Grandassa Models in 1962.

Naturally pageants
On January 28, 1962, with his brother Elombe Brath, Brathwaite staged the Naturally '62 pageant, the first of a series of pageants to  feature only black models. The 1962 pageant has the title The Original African Coiffure and Fashion Extravaganza Designed to Restore Our Racial Pride & Standards. Held at the Harlem Purple Manor, a nightclub on East 125th Street, it helped to popularize the phrase "Black Is Beautiful" that was printed on the pageant's poster. The Naturally pageants ran for five years, with the last one held in 1966.

In the 1960s, his work also appeared in New York Amsterdam News, The City Sun, and The Daily Challenge. He photographed concerts of Stevie Wonder, Bob Marley, James Brown, and Muhammad Ali.

In 2017, Brathwaite was honored at the 75th Aperture Gala.

Exhibitions 

 2019 Black Is Beautiful: The Photography of Kwame Brathwaite, organized by Aperture Foundation
 2019 Icons of Style: A Century of Fashion Photography, Museum of Fine Arts, Houston, Houston, Texas
 2020 Tools of Revolution: Fashion Photography and Activism, Houston Center for Photography, Houston, Texas

References 

1938 births
Living people
African-American photographers
High School of Art and Design alumni
20th-century American painters
Photographers from New York City
Photographers from New York (state)
American people of Barbadian descent
20th-century African-American painters
21st-century African-American people